Kang & Kodos' Twirl 'n' Hurl is a theme park attraction at Universal Studios Florida, which opened on August 11, 2013. The ride is based on The Simpsons Treehouse of Horror specials.

History
Kang & Kodos' Twirl 'n' Hurl is a part of the Springfield expansion of Universal Studios Florida. As part of the expansion, the International Food & Film Festival was demolished in order to make way for Fast Food Boulevard. Minigames were built in front of The Simpsons Ride and the Duff Gardens; Lard Lad Donuts, and Bumblebee Man's Taco Truck were built as well. Kang & Kodos' Twirl 'n' Hurl was the last experience opened in the Springfield expansion. The ride is manufactured by Zamperla.

Ride summary

Queue
The queue is a brief walk around the spinner and into a shaded area where guests board the ride. While waiting, guests can watch brief clips from the Treehouse of Horror specials.

Ride
Guests enter their UFO spaceships. Once the ride starts, Kodos exclaims she has tricked the guests and the only way to get off the ride is to "attack" Springfield. Nelson, Homer, Bart, Willie and Grandpa will interact with the riders when the riders pass their faces which also spin when they are passed. Also during the ride, Kodos interacts with the riders as well. When the ride ends, she says that she is the only one who truly had fun.

See also
 The Simpsons Ride

References

The Simpsons
Amusement rides manufactured by Zamperla
Amusement rides introduced in 2013
Universal Studios Florida
2013 establishments in Florida
Amusement rides based on works by Matt Groening
Amusement rides based on television franchises
Licensed properties at Universal Parks & Resorts